Choluteca is one of the 18 departments (departamentos) into which Honduras is divided. The departmental capital is the city of Choluteca. The Choluteca River runs through the department.

History 
In the exercise of this industry they reached the South Coast of Honduras, and founded the settlement of what is now the city of Choluteca hundreds of years before the Spanish conquest.

Choluteca was created as a division of colonial rule from Guatemala in March 1535. Upon independence from Spain, the department of Choluteca was created on June 28, 1825, as one of the seven original departments in which Honduras was divided after independence during the government of the first head of state of Honduras, Dionisio de Herrera. Its borders were changed twice after the original partition. In 1843 the district of Guascorán was added to its territory, until then part of Comayagua. In 1893 its westernmost part was split, with the creation of the Valle department.

Geography 
Choluteca is the southernmost department of Honduras with an area of 4360 km². In 2015 it had an estimated population of 447,852 inhabitants. Chuleteca has many lands that are used for agriculture, fishing, sugar production, and shrimp farms. The head of the department is the city of Choluteca, which is located on the Choluteca river that crosses the department. One crosses the Choluteca Bridge to enter the city.

Choluteca is bordered to the north by the departments of Francisco Morazán and El Paraíso, to the west by the Golfo de Fonseca and the department of Valle, and to the east and south by Nicaragua.

Governance

Municipalities

 Apacilagua
 Choluteca
 Concepción de María
 Duyure
 El Corpus
 El Triunfo
 Marcovia
 Morolica
 Namasigue
 Orocuina
 Pespire
 San Antonio de Flores
 San Isidro
 San José
 San Marcos de Colón
 Santa Ana de Yusguare

Deputies
The Choluteca Department has a number of 9 deputies elected for the National Congress.

Economy

The department is, historically, a prominent producer of gold, silver, and copper. The region also had a cattle industry.

References

Notes 

 
Departments of Honduras
States and territories established in 1825